Felipe Albertin Paulino Del Guidice (born October 5, 1983) is a Dominican-Venezuelan former professional baseball pitcher. He played in Major League Baseball (MLB) for the Houston Astros, Colorado Rockies, Kansas City Royals and Chicago White Sox, and in Nippon Professional Baseball (NPB) with the Saitama Seibu Lions.

Career

Houston Astros
Paulino was signed as an undrafted free agent on July 2, 2001. He was called up to the major leagues in September 2007. He made his major league debut on September 5, 2007, against the Milwaukee Brewers and through 3 innings, he gave up 5 runs.

Colorado Rockies
On November 18, 2010, Paulino was traded to the Colorado Rockies for Clint Barmes. He was designated for assignment on May 21, 2011.

Kansas City Royals
Paulino was traded to the Kansas City Royals for cash considerations on May 26, 2011. He made 20 starts for the Royals in 2011, striking out 119 batters over 124 2/3 innings of work, posting a season record of 4–6 with a 4.11 ERA.
Paulio started the 2012 season on the disabled list with right elbow strain, but after missing the first 6 games he came back to post a 3–1 with a 1.67 ERA over seven starts. It was during the seventh start that Paulino experienced major elbow problems, and was placed back on the disabled list on June 9. On June 22, it was announced that he would miss the rest of the 2012 season due to a torn UCL. He underwent ulnar collateral ligament replacement, (aka Tommy John surgery) on July 3, 2012.

The Royals signed Paulino to a one-year, $1.75 million contract on November 29, 2012. He began the 2013 season on the 60-day disabled list as he was still recovering from the Tommy John surgery he previously had. He began throwing sessions as part of his rehabilitation and began pitching in the minor leagues in May, but never pitched for the Royals in 2013. He was designated for assignment on November 20, 2013, and chose to become a free agent.

Chicago White Sox
On December 9, 2013, the White Sox signed Paulino to a one-year deal worth $1.75 million with a team option for 2015.

Boston Red Sox
Paulino signed a minor league contract with the Boston Red Sox on January 29, 2015. He was released on March 31.

Chicago Cubs
On May 11, 2015, Paulino signed a minor league contract with the Chicago Cubs.

2015 WBSC Premier12

In November 2015, Paulino participated with the Venezuela national team in the inaugural WBSC Premier12.

Cleveland Indians
On December 11, 2015, Paulino signed a minor league deal with the Cleveland Indians. The Indians released him on May 28, 2016.

Saitama Seibu Lions 
On May 31, 2016, Paulino signed a one-year contract worth 60 million Yen with the Saitama Seibu Lions.

Sugar Land Skeeters
On March 29, 2017, Paulino signed with the Sugar Land Skeeters of the Atlantic League of Professional Baseball.

Saraperos de Saltillo
On May 25, 2017, Paulino's contract was purchased by the Saraperos de Saltillo of the Mexican Baseball League. He was released on July 25, 2017.

Sugar Land Skeeters (Second stint)
On July 30, 2017, Paulino signed with the Sugar Land Skeeters of the Atlantic League of Professional Baseball. He re-signed with the team for the 2018 and 2019 seasons.

Houston Astros (Second stint)
On June 17, 2019, Paulino's contract was purchased by the Houston Astros and he was assigned to the Triple-A Round Rock Express. On August 29, 2019, he requested and was later granted his release from the organization so that he could return to Sugar Land for the 2019 Atlantic League playoffs.

Sugar Land Skeeters (Third stint)
On August 29, 2019, Paulino re-signed with the Sugar Land Skeeters of the Atlantic League of Professional Baseball. In July 2020, Paulino signed on to play for the Skeeters in the Constellation Energy League (a makeshift 4-team independent league created as a result of the COVID-19 pandemic) for the 2020 season.

Pitching style
Paulino throws two hard fastballs, a four-seamer at 93–97 mph and a two-seam fastball at 95–98 mph. His secondary pitch is a slider at 85–88. He also has a curveball (77–80) and changeup (85–87). His curve and change are used primarily against left-handed hitters.

References

External links

, or Retrosheet, or Pura Pelota (VPBL stats)

1983 births
Living people
Bravos de Margarita players
Charlotte Knights players
Chicago White Sox players
Colorado Rockies players
Columbus Clippers players
Corpus Christi Hooks players
Dominican Republic expatriate baseball players in Japan
Dominican Republic expatriate baseball players in Mexico
Dominican Republic expatriate baseball players in the United States
Greeneville Astros players
Houston Astros players
Iowa Cubs players
Kansas City Royals players
Leones del Caracas players
Lexington Legends players
Major League Baseball pitchers
Major League Baseball players from the Dominican Republic
Martinsville Astros players
Mexican League baseball pitchers
Nippon Professional Baseball pitchers
Northwest Arkansas Naturals players
Omaha Storm Chasers players
Round Rock Express players
Saitama Seibu Lions players
Salem Avalanche players
Tri-City ValleyCats players
Saraperos de Saltillo players
Sugar Land Skeeters players
Venezuela national baseball team players
Venezuelan expatriate baseball players in Japan
Venezuelan expatriate baseball players in Mexico
Venezuelan expatriate baseball players in the United States
Venezuelan people of Dominican Republic descent
2015 WBSC Premier12 players